Hisham Kiwan (born 17 May 1987) is an Arab-Israeli footballer currently playing for Hapoel Karmiel.

External links

Living people
1987 births
Arab-Israeli footballers
Arab citizens of Israel
Israeli footballers
Hapoel Haifa F.C. players
Maccabi Ahi Nazareth F.C. players
Hapoel Bnei Lod F.C. players
Ihud Bnei Majd al-Krum F.C. players
Hapoel Karmiel F.C. players
Liga Leumit players
Israeli Premier League players
Footballers from Majd al-Krum
Association football midfielders
Association football forwards